Commonweal or common weal may refer to:

 Common good, what is shared and beneficial for members of a given community
 Common Weal, a Scottish think tank and advocacy group
 Commonweal (magazine), an American lay-Catholic-oriented magazine (1924–present)
 Commonweal (newspaper), a British socialist newspaper (1885–1894)
 Commonwealth, a form of government without a monarch in which people have governmental influence

See also
 League of the Public Weal, a French feudal alliance in the 15th century
 Mad War (or War of the Public Weal), a 15th-century conflict between feudal lords and the French monarchy
 Commonweal Lodge
 Commonweal Party, an Indian political party that existed in Tamil Nadu between 1951 and 1954
 Commonweal School, in Swindon, Wiltshire, England.
 Commonweal Theatre Company, a professional, live theatre company in Lanesboro, Minnesota, United States
 Common Good (disambiguation)
 Commonwealth (disambiguation)